An individual's or community's religious orientation involves presumptions about the existence and nature of God or gods, religious prescriptions about morality and communal and personal spirituality. Such presumptions involve the study of psychology, ethics, sociology and anthropology.

Psychology

According to Whitley and Kite, researchers who were interested in studying the psychological effects of religion on prejudice initially studied the relationship between simple indicators of religiosity such as whether or not a person went to church and the level of prejudice that that person showed. Surprisingly these researchers found that "religious involvement was consistently correlated with a variety of forms of prejudice." (Whitley & Kite, 2010) 

Naturally these findings were not well received by religious leaders or the religious community in general. It was at this point that there was a clear shift in the nature of the research. Instead of being concerned with factors such as church attendance and the quantity of religious involvement, researchers were now interested in the quality of religious involvement. As Whitley and Kite said, "These ideas evolved into the concepts of intrinsic and extrinsic religious orientation." (Whitley & Kite, 2010)

Measuring

Allport & Ross developed a means of measuring  religious orientation. The Extrinsic measures extrinsic religious orientation (1967). A sample statement from this scale would be “The church is most important as a place to formulate good social relationships” (Whitley & Kite, 2010). This scale brought forth a lot of interest in religious orientations and much research has been done over the years. But as more researchers began studying religious orientation, the more problems that arose with the Intrinsic and Extrinsic scales measuring what they were supposed to be measuring (Hunsberger & Jacson, 2005).

Extrinsic

Extrinsic Religious Orientation is a method of using religion to achieve non-religious goals, essentially viewing religion as a means to an end. It is used by people who go to religious gatherings and claim certain religious ideologies to establish or maintain social networks while minimally adhering to the teachings of the religion. People high in extrinsic religious orientation are more likely to conform to social norms and demands rather than what the religion requires, and are often prone to twist religious beliefs to serve their own political goals. Gordon Allport stated that people high in extrinsic religious orientation use religion, “to provide security and solace, sociability and distraction, status and self-justification” (Allport &Ross, 1967, p. 434). (Whitley & Kite, 2010)

Prejudice

Hunsberger & Jackson did a review of studies on religious orientation that had taken place since 1990 (2005). Links have been made between prejudice and religious orientation, but there has been no agreement on the relationship with intolerance. This is because there are many targets of prejudice, such as race, ethnicity, gender, sexual orientation, and age. Hunsberger and Jackson have found support for the idea that the target of prejudice is important when looking at prejudice and religious orientation relationships. After careful analysis, they have found that extrinsic orientation is positively related to racial/ethnic and gay/lesbian intolerance. People who measure high in extrinsic religious orientation have a utilitarian approach and view religion as a meaningful source of social status. Having high extrinsic religious orientation means you conform to popular trends, such trends including prejudice. The validity of the religious orientation scales have proved debatable, thus relationships to prejudice have either supported or refuted Allport and Ross's theories (Hunsberger & Jackson, 2005).

Intrinsic

According to Whitley and Kite, a person with an Intrinsic Religious Orientation sincerely believes in their religion and all its teachings and attempts to live their life as their religion teaches that they should (Whitley & Kite, 2010). This agrees with what Daniel Batson implies; that while a person with an extrinsic religious orientation sees religion as a means to an end, a person with an intrinsic orientation sees their religion as that end. To them their religion is, "An active directing force, not just a tool used to reach self-serving ends." Those with this orientation find their religion to be the most important aspect of their life and seek to contextualize other aspects of their life through their religion.

Prejudice

Research has found that people who hold an intrinsic religious orientation sincerely believe in and follow the teachings of their religion. They "live" their religion, and as a result those "with a strong internal orientation should be unprejudiced to the extent that their religions teach inter- group tolerance." Studies have found that these people show either no correlation or a negative correlation for racial prejudice. On the other hand, these same people often show a positive correlation for prejudice against gays. This effect would be predicted, being that while most religions do not speak ill of other races (racism being due to upbringing rather than any Biblical foundation), they do tend to view homosexuality as behavior the Bible prohibits. 

While this research appears more favorable than the research that showed a correlation between religious activity and prejudice, some researchers are convinced that these people are merely showing what they believe to be a more socially acceptable bias. Batson tested this hypothesis by having participants in a study (a study the participants were led to believe was about watching and evaluating a movie) choose whether to sit in a theater with a white confederate, or a black one. There were two conditions in this study, an overt condition in which both theaters were showing the same movie and a covert condition in which each theater was showing a different movie. The researchers believed that a prejudiced person who was attempting to appear unprejudiced would sit with the black confederate when the movie selection was the same in order to appear unprejudiced, but would sit with the white confederate (participants were white) when their choice could be attributed to wanting to watch the different movie. The researchers found that 75% of intrinsically religious participants chose to sit with the black confederate in the overt condition, but only 46% choose to sit with the black confederate in the covert condition. While these results do show that intrinsically motivated people do want to appear racially unbiased, it also shows that they are not racially prejudiced in general. Contrary to the religious orientations theory, extrinsic religiosity was unrelated to prejudice in either condition.

Example

An example would be a person who truly believes in their religion and uses this belief to guide them in all other aspects of their life.

Quest orientation

A third religious orientation proposed by Batson is the quest orientation. People with this orientation treats their religion not as a means or an end, but a search for truth. As Batson said, "An individual who approaches religion in this way recognizes that he or she does not know, and probably never will know, the final truth about such matters. Still the questions are deemed important, and however tentative and subject to changes, answers are sought."

Prejudice

Intuitively, it is logical to assume that people who hold a quest orientation would be low in prejudice because by having this orientation they have already shown that they are open-minded and willing to change. This idea was tested alongside the intrinsic and extrinsic orientations by Batson in his theater experiment (described above in the "Intrinsic Religious Orientation and Prejudice" section). People who scored high in quest orientation choose to sit with the black confederate about half the time in both the overt and covert conditions, indicating both a lack of prejudice and a lack of the attempt to appear unprejudiced. To summarize Whitley and Kite as well as Batson, quest orientation appears to be the source of "universal love and compassion" that has long been sought by both religious scholars and researchers interested in the psychology of religion.

Example

Examples of people who have attained a quest orientation are Gautama Buddha, Malcolm X, and Mohandas Karamchand Gandhi.

See also

References

Sociology of religion